The Passengers is a French 1977 drama film directed by Serge Leroy and starring Jean-Louis Trintignant. It was released in the United States as The Intruder. It is based on Dean Koontz's 1973 novel Shattered.

Cast
 Jean-Louis Trintignant as Alex Moineau
 Mireille Darc as Nicole
 Bernard Fresson as Fabio
 Richard Constantini as Marc
 Adolfo Celi as Boetani
 Angela Goodwin
 Yves Barsacq

References

External links

1977 films
1977 drama films
French drama films
Italian drama films
1970s French-language films
Films based on American novels
Films based on works by Dean Koontz
Films scored by Claude Bolling
1970s French films
1970s Italian films